Syed Musa Abbas Raza, (25 December 1925 – 11 June 1982) better known as Santosh Kumar, was a Pakistani film actor who was popular in the 1950s and 1960s. He was from an Urdu-speaking family from Lahore, Pakistan. His brother Darpan was also a film actor during the same period, while his other brother S. Suleman was a film director.

Early life and career
Santosh Kumar's birth name was Syed Musa Raza. He was born in 1925 in Lahore, British India. He graduated from Osmania University, Hyderabad, British India.

After the Partition of India in 1947, Santosh Kumar migrated to Lahore, Pakistan with his family.

Owing to his education and awareness, Santosh Kumar was always designated to lead the entourage to represent Pakistan in meetings held abroad, and because of this became known as the foreign minister of the Pakistani film industry. This was revealed by him in one of his interviews broadcast by the Radio Pakistan in the mid sixties.

Initially, he was married to Jamila Begum, but subsequently married actress Sabiha Khanum on 1 October 1958. The first Nigar Award for best actor in the history of Nigar Awards was presented to him in film Waada (1957). Then he won the Best Actor Nigar Awards for 1962 and 1963. Finally he was awarded Sitara-i-Imtiaz Award by the President of Pakistan in 2010 long after his death. Shaam Dhalay (1960) is the only movie he produced, directed and played the lead role in. He died on 11 June 1982.

Santosh Kumar was Pakistan's superstar film hero, along with Sudhir, but he was the first-ever top romantic hero. His first film was Ahinsa in 1947 in India. In Pakistan, his first film was Beli in 1950, and in the same year he became film hero of the first-ever Pakistani silver jubilee Urdu film Do Ansoo (1950). He was later married to Sabiha Khanum.

Filmography-his major films

Death
Santosh Kumar died on 11 June 1982 at age 56.

Awards and recognition
Sitara-i-Imtiaz (Star of Excellence) Award by the President of Pakistan in 2010
 3 Nigar Awards for Best Actor in 1957, 1962 and 1963

See also 
 List of Lollywood actors

References

External links
 website (Santosh Kumar Filmography)

1925 births
1982 deaths
Pakistani male film actors
Recipients of Sitara-i-Imtiaz
Nigar Award winners
Osmania University alumni
Male actors from Lahore
20th-century Pakistani male actors